Argyll and Bute Council is one of the 32 local authorities of Scotland, covering the Argyll and Bute council area. 

Thirty-six representative members make up the council, elected, since 2007, by single transferable vote and, before that, by the first-past-the-post system. The 2017 election saw the SNP become the largest group. This was the first time since the creation of the modern authority that the representatives of a political party had outnumbered Independents in holding the largest number of seats on the council; nevertheless, it was a coalition of Independents, Conservatives, and Liberal Democrats who would go on to form an administration following the election.

Political control 
The first election to Argyll and Bute District Council was held in 1974, initially operating as a shadow authority alongside the outgoing authorities until the new system came into force on 16 May 1975. A shadow authority was again elected in 1995 ahead of the change to council areas which came into force on 1 April 1996. Political control of Argyll and Bute since 1975 has been as follows:

Argyll and Bute District Council

Argyll and Bute Council

Leadership 
The leaders of the council since 1996 have been:

Premises 
The council is based at Kilmory Castle in Lochgilphead, which had been built as a large country house in the 1820s and had been bought in 1974 and converted to become the headquarters of the Argyll and Bute District Council.

NeverSeconds 

In June 2012, the council was criticised for banning a local primary student, Martha Payne (aged 9), from taking photographs of her school dinners for her online blog. The blog, NeverSeconds, had been praised by the celebrity chef, Jamie Oliver, had attracted over two million visits, and at the time of the ban had raised nearly £2,000 for a food charity. On the day the story broke, the blog had raised over £40,000. After an initial statement from the council defending the decision, the ban was subsequently overturned by council leader, Roddy McCuish.
In November 2012 a book written by David Payne, Martha's father, revealed the background to the council's attempt to censor and bully a 9-year-old girl. The book says: "My anger and frustration at Argyll and Bute Council was not being soothed by time. Thinly veiled attacks on our parenting on national radio and an abusive phonecall stood out as examples of a public body sick to the very top. Complaints via the proper procedures and through elected councillors had brought no visible changes. Far from being contrite they seemed to take a pride in being untouchable."

Elections
Since 2007 elections have been held every five years under the single transferable vote system, introduced by the Local Governance (Scotland) Act 2004. Election results since 1995 have been as follows:

Wards

Eleven multi-member wards were created for the 2007 election, replacing 36 single-member wards which had been in place since 1999 (adjusted up from 33 in the 1990s):

South Kintyre (3 seats)
Kintyre and the Islands (3 seats)
Mid Argyll (3 seats)
Oban South and the Isles (4 seats)
Oban North and Lorn (4 seats)
Cowal (3 seats)
Dunoon (3 seats)
Isle of Bute (3 seats)
Lomond North (3 seats)
Helensburgh Central (4 seats)
Helensburgh and Lomond South (3 seats)

See also
2012 Argyll and Bute Council election
Censorship in the United Kingdom

References

Local authorities of Scotland
Politics of Argyll and Bute
Organisations based in Argyll and Bute
Lochgilphead